Pitts Special is a roller coaster made by Gerstlauer for the PowerPark amusement park in Alahärmä, Finland. The ride opened during the summer of 2020. The ride has a vertical 43-meter-high lifting hill right at the beginning, after which the train accelerates immediately to its top speed of 100 kilometers per hour.

References

Roller coasters in Finland